The 2022–23 Basketball Bundesliga, known as the easyCredit BBL for sponsorship reasons, is the 57th season of the Basketball Bundesliga (BBL), the top-tier level of professional club basketball in Germany. It runs from 28 September 2022 to 20 June 2023.

In October 2022, the BBL decided to change the standings formula, changing from two points for a win to a percentage crteria.

Teams

Team changes

As only one team was promoted, Frankfurt was awarded a wild card on 2 June 2022.

Arenas and locations

Regular season

Standings

Results

Playoffs
All three rounds of the playoffs are played in a best-of-five format, with the higher seeded team playing the first, third and fifth game at home

German clubs in European competitions

References

External links
Official website 

Basketball Bundesliga seasons
German
Germany